Bruce Ward McLennan (28 April 1928 – 5 August 2015) was an  Australian rules footballer who played with St Kilda in the Victorian Football League (VFL).

Notes

External links 

1928 births
2015 deaths
Australian rules footballers from Victoria (Australia)
St Kilda Football Club players